Adam Birnbaum (born 1979) is an American jazz pianist, composer, and arranger. He was the winner of the 2004 American Pianists Association Cole Porter Fellowship in Jazz.

Life and career
Birnbaum was born in 1979. He studied "music theory, chamber music, and classical and jazz performance" at the New England Conservatory of Music's Preparatory School. He graduated from Boston College in 2001, and went on to study at the Juilliard School. In 2004, he won the 2004 American Pianists Association Cole Porter Fellowship in Jazz. Birnbaum toured Japan and South Korea in 2008 as part of the Juilliard Jazz All-Stars.

In 2008 Birnbaum received a Chamber Music America grant to compose music for a piano trio. From around 2009 Birnbaum has been part of drummer Al Foster's quartet.

Playing style
The Down Beat reviewer of Birnbaum's 2015 album Three of a Mind commented that the pianist "has a light touch, with playing that dances over the bars. He favors major keys, and his lyricism seems to sparkle".

Discography
An asterisk (*) indicates that the year is that of release.

As leader/co-leader

As sideman

References

1979 births
American jazz pianists
American male pianists
Boston College alumni
Juilliard School alumni
Living people
21st-century American pianists
21st-century American male musicians
American male jazz musicians